Christian demonology appears many times in the bible:
 Hell in popular culture
 The Devil in popular culture

Names of gods and demons from Jewish and Christian sources are often used in film, TV, comics, and video games.
 Abaddon in popular culturefrom Book of Revelation
 Azazel in popular culturefrom Leviticus
 Azrael (disambiguation) from Apocalypse of Peter
 Baal in popular culturefrom 1 Kings
 Belial in popular culturefrom Deuteronomy
 Leviathan in popular culturefrom the Book of Job
 Lilith in popular culturefrom Isaiah and the Talmud
 Moloch in popular culturefrom 2 Kings
 Mammon in popular culturefrom Gospel of Matthew
 Nephilim in popular culturefrom Genesis 6

Demons in popular culture